The Group of Non-Partisan Citizens (BPG) was a political party in Latvia in the early 1920s.

History
The party won six seats in the 1920 Constitutional Assembly elections, making it the joint fourth-largest faction in the Assembly. However, it did not contest any further elections.

References

Defunct political parties in Latvia